William Alfred Smith (April 1882 – after 1912) was an English professional footballer who made 38 appearances in the Football League playing for West Bromwich Albion and Birmingham. He played as a right-sided forward.

Smith was born in West Bromwich, Staffordshire. He began his football career with Old Hill Wanderers and Worcester City before joining Second Division champions West Bromwich Albion in 1902. He played 21 league games for the club before dropping back into non-league football with Brierley Hill Alliance. In 1908 he returned to the Football League with Birmingham, where he formed a useful partnership with Benny Green. He lost his place when Jack Wilcox arrived, and moved back to Coventry City. A period with Birmingham Combination club Nuneaton Town preceded a third spell at Coventry.

References

1882 births
Year of death missing
Sportspeople from West Bromwich
English footballers
Association football forwards
Old Hill Wanderers F.C. players
Worcester City F.C. players
West Bromwich Albion F.C. players
Brierley Hill Alliance F.C. players
Coventry City F.C. players
Birmingham City F.C. players
Nuneaton Borough F.C. players
English Football League players
Southern Football League players
Date of birth missing